Confines is a town and municipality in the Santander Department in northeastern Colombia.

External links

 

Municipalities of Santander Department